Ketenimines are a group of organic compounds sharing a common functional group with the general structure R1R2C=C=NR3. A ketenimine is a cumulated alkene and imine and is related to an allene and a ketene.

The parent compound is ketenimine or CH2CNH. The most recent work by Bane et al. investigates the rovibrational structure of the ν8 and ν12 bands in the high-resolution FTIR spectrum, complementing the earlier analysis of the pure rotational spectrum. This pair of Coriolis coupled bands provide a rare example where intensity sharing between bands yields sufficient intensity for an otherwise invisible band (ν12).

References

Functional groups